Port Moody station was a stop on the West Coast Express commuter rail line connecting Vancouver to Mission, British Columbia, Canada. The station opened in 1995, when the West Coast Express began operating. All services were operated by TransLink.

The station closed for revenue service on December 1, 2016, coinciding with the opening of SkyTrain's Evergreen Extension the next day. Moody Centre station serves as a replacement station and continues to be served by the West Coast Express commuter rail service.

History

The first station in Port Moody was built in 1882 as the original western terminus for the Canadian Pacific Railway, before it was extended to Vancouver. The second railway station, built in 1908, was first moved to a location west of Queen Street in 1945 and, when the CPR discontinued passenger service in 1976, was bought by The Port Moody Historical Society, who moved it again in 1978 to Murray Street, where it now serves as the home of the Port Moody Station Museum.

Services
Port Moody was served by five West Coast Express trains per day in each direction: five in the morning to Vancouver, and five in the evening to Mission. In addition, there were two inbound buses (branded as "TrainBus") operating from Mission to Vancouver in the morning (after morning train service has ended) and three outbound buses in the evening returning to Mission (after all evening train service has ended), stopping at all West Coast Express stations. There were no West Coast Express service on weekends and holidays. The station was adjacent to a bus loop and park-and-ride facility (now incorporated with Moody Centre station), which were served by the local bus, express bus, and Community Shuttle minibus services.

At the nearby intersection of St. John's Street and Williams Street, 97 B-Line buses provided service to Coquitlam Central and Lougheed Town Centre stations.

References

Buildings and structures in Port Moody
West Coast Express stations
Railway stations in Canada opened in 1995
Railway stations closed in 2016